Lankesteria may refer to:
 Lankesteria (plant), a genus of plants in the family Acanthaceae
 Lankesteria (protist), a genus of protists in the family Lecudinidae